Caminho de Ferro de Penafiel à Lixa e Entre-os-Rios is a closed railway branch in Portugal, which connected the cities of Penafiel, Lixa and Entre-os-Rios. It was opened in 1912 and closed in 1929.

See also 
 List of railway lines in Portugal
 History of rail transport in Portugal

References

Railway lines in Portugal
Railway lines opened in 1912
Railway lines closed in 1929